Love Songs for Patriots is the eighth studio album by American indie rock band American Music Club, released on October 12, 2004 by Merge Records and Devil in the Woods in the United States and by Cooking Vinyl in Europe.

American Music Club reformed in 2003 to considerable critical acclaim and recorded Love Songs for Patriots in San Francisco in spare time between day jobs and other commitments. The album's songs were all written by Mark Eitzel and many had been performed  live by him in solo performances before the band's reformation.

Track listing
"Ladies and Gentlemen" – 3:18
"Another Morning" – 3:21
"Patriot's Heart" – 6:01
"Love Is" – 4:27
"Job to Do" – 5:04
"Only Love Can Set You Free" – 5:55
"Mantovani the Mind Reader" – 4:05
"Home" – 4:27
"Myopic Books" – 3:31
"America Loves the Minstrel Show" – 4:21
"The Horseshoe Wreath in Bloom" – 4:40
"Song of the Rats Leaving the Sinking Ship" – 4:21
"The Devil Needs You" – 7:37

The vinyl LP also includes "1000 Miles".

Personnel
American Music Club
Marc Capelle – piano, organ, brass arrangements
Mark Eitzel – vocals, guitars
Tim Mooney – drums
Dan Pearson – bass guitar
Vudi – guitars

Additional personnel
Brad Johnson – paintings and design
Jude Mooney – band pictures
Matt Pence – mixing

References

2004 albums
American Music Club albums
Cooking Vinyl albums
Merge Records albums